The Trojan Horse is a 1940 thriller novel by the British writer Hammond Innes. A London lawyer decides to help a German inventor suspected of murder.

References

Bibliography
 James Vinson & D. L. Kirkpatrick. Contemporary Novelists. St. James Press, 1986.

1940 British novels
Novels by Hammond Innes
British thriller novels
Novels set in London
William Collins, Sons books